Discoglypremna is a plant genus of the family Euphorbiaceae first described as a genus in 1911. It contains only one known species, Discoglypremna caloneura, native to tropical Africa (Benin, Ghana, Guinea, Liberia, Ivory Coast, Nigeria, Sierra Leone, Togo, Cabinda, São Tomé & Principé, Central African Republic, Equatorial Guinea, Congo, Zaire, Uganda).

References

Monotypic Euphorbiaceae genera
Acalyphoideae
Flora of West Tropical Africa
Flora of West-Central Tropical Africa
Flora of Uganda